The von Bertalanffy growth function (VBGF), or von Bertalanffy curve, is a type of growth curve for a time series and is named after Ludwig von Bertalanffy. It is a special case of the generalised logistic function. The growth curve is used to model mean length from age in animals. The function is commonly applied in ecology to model fish growth and in paleontology to model sclerochronological parameters of shell growth.

The model can be written as the following:

 

It is the solution of the following linear differential equation:

Seasonally-adjusted von Bertalanffy
The seasonally-adjusted von Bertalanffy is an extension of this function that accounts for organism growth that occurs seasonally. It was created by I. F. Somers in 1988.

See also

 Gompertz function
 Monod equation
 Michaelis–Menten kinetics

References

Growth curves
Mathematical modeling